The 2005 European Athletics Indoor Championships were held at the Palacio de Deportes in Madrid, the capital city of Spain, from Friday, 4 March to Sunday, 6 March 2005. This was the first edition to be held in an odd year since switching to the biennial format, so as not to occur in the same as the outdoor European Athletics Championships and also recently moved IAAF World Indoor Championships. To accommodate this change, there was a two-year gap since the previous edition. It also marked the last time that the 200 metres were contested at the event.

Russia finished on top of the medal table with 17 medals including 9 gold and a clear lead over Sweden and France. The host nation Spain lost only to Russia on the number of medals but won only one gold and finished fifth overall.

Medal summary

Men

Note: Britain's Mark Lewis-Francis, second in men's 60 m (6.59), was later disqualified for doping offence (tetrahydrocannabinol).

Women

Notes:
(*) Turkey's Tezeta Desalegn-Dengersa originally won the 3,000 m silver medal in 8:46.65, but was later disqualified for doping offence (metenolone).  This was announced on April 6, 2006.
(**) Bianca Kappler was awarded joint bronze medal as final jump was incorrectly measured. The jump was misread, putting her in first place, but she pointed out the mistake and was awarded the medal for fair play.

Medal table

Participating nations

 (2)
 (1)
 (8)
 (11)
 (9)
 (8)
 (6)
 (3)
 (16)
 (5)
 (10)
 (13)
 (44)
 (2)
 (36)
 (44)
 (24)
 (6)
 (1)
 (16)
 (2)
 (21)
 (5)
 (1)
 (3)
 (1)
 (3)
 (2)
 (12)
 (31)
 (13)
 (18)
 (64)
 (4)
 (6)
 (17)
 (46)
 (20)
 (6)
 (2)
 (21)

See also
2005 in athletics (track and field)

References
 Athletix

 
European Athletics Indoor Championships
European Indoor
A
A
International athletics competitions hosted by Spain
March 2005 sports events in Europe
2005 in Madrid